Brad Schiff is an American stop-motion animation supervisor. Known for his works at Laika as an animation supervisor in acclaimed films such as ParaNorman (2012), The Boxtrolls (2014) and Kubo and the Two Strings for which he received an Academy Award for Best Visual Effects nomination at the 89th Academy Awards.

Filmography

Awards 
 2001: Primetime Emmy Award for Outstanding Individual Achievement in Animation - Gary & Mike
 2013: Visual Effects Society Award for Outstanding Animation in an Animated Feature Motion Picture - ParaNorman 
 2015: Visual Effects Society Award for Outstanding Animation in an Animated Feature Motion Picture - The Boxtrolls
 2017: Visual Effects Society Award for Outstanding Animation in an Animated Feature Motion Picture - Kubo and the Two Strings
 2019: Visual Effects Society Award for Outstanding Animation in an Animated Feature Motion Picture - Missing Link 
 2016: Academy Award for Best Visual Effects - Kubo and the Two Strings

References

External links
 Brad Schiff at Laika
 

Living people
Special effects people
Year of birth missing (living people)